What a Night! A Christmas Album, by American singer, pianist and bandleader Harry Connick Jr., was released on November 4, 2008., being his third Christmas album, since 1993's When My Heart Finds Christmas and 2003's Harry for the Holidays. The album consists of new recordings of Christmas classics, and new songs written by Connick.

The first public mentioning of recording the album, came in an interview in The Times-Picayune in June 2008.

The album was first called Christmas Day, but the title was changed in September 2008, to What a Night! A Christmas Album.

The track "Song for the Hopeful", is a duet with Kim Burrell. The song was written by Connick for the 2008 television film Living Proof. Burell is also featured on "Let There Be Peace On Earth".

Connick has three daughters with his wife Jill Goodacre, and their middle daughter Sarah Kate, sings a duet with him on the track "Winter Wonderland".

When the track list was first announced, the songs "Christmas Time is Here" and "Trinity", was part of the album. In early October, those two tracks were replaced with two new tracks: "Christmas Day", and an instrumental version of Tchaikovsky's "Dance of the Sugar Plum Fairy".

Track listing
"It's the Most Wonderful Time of the Year" (Edward Pola, George Wyle) – 3:28
"What a Night!" (Harry Connick Jr.) – 3:24
"Christmas Day" (Connick) – 3:24
"Have a Holly Jolly Christmas" (Johnny Marks) – 4:05
"Please Come Home for Christmas" (Charles Brown, Gene Redd) – 4:26
"O Come All Ye Faithful" (traditional) – 4:15
"Dance Of The Sugarplum Fairies" (Pyotr Ilyich Tchaikovsky) – 2:46
"Let There Be Peace On Earth" (Sy Miller, Jill Jackson) – 3:30 – feat. Kim Burrell
"Winter Wonderland" (Felix Bernard, Richard B. Smith) – 3:50 – feat. Kate Connick
"It's Beginning to Look a Lot Like Christmas" (Meredith Willson) – 3:30
"Santariffic" (Connick) – 3:58 – feat. Lucien Barbarin
"Jingle Bells" (James Lord Pierpont) – 5:28
"Zat You Santa Claus" (Jack Fox) – 3:40
"We Three Kings" (Reverend John Henry Hopkins Jr.) – 4:45
"Song for the Hopeful" (Connick) – 4:35 – feat. Kim Burrell

iTunes bonus track
"Auld Lang Syne" (traditional) – 2:16 (album only)
Digital Booklet (album only)

Barnes & Noble Exclusive Version
"Deck the Halls" (traditional) – 2:57
"Christmas Time is Here" (Vince Guaraldi, Lee Mendelson) – 5:06
"O Christmas Tree" (traditional) – 3:22

Disc 2 (DVD)
Holiday interview with Harry
Photo gallery
"(It Must Have Been) Ol’ Santa Claus" 
"I Pray on Christmas" 
"The Happy Elf" * 

 [*] also found on the Harry for the Holidays DVD

Charts

Weekly charts

Year-end charts

Personnel
Arrangement by Harry Connick Jr.

Harry Connick Jr. – vocals, piano
Lucien Barbarin – trombone
Kim Burrell – vocals, piano, keyboards
Kate Connick – vocals
James Hall & Worship & Praise – background vocals
Jonathan Batiste – vocals, keyboards, piano
Neal Caine – bass
Jonathan DuBose Jr. – vocals, guitar
Charles "Ned" Goold – alto saxophone
Jerry Weldon – tenor saxophone
Dave Schumacher – baritone saxophone
Roger Ingram – trumpet
Tony Kadlek – flugelhorn
Joe Magnarelli – trumpet
Jeff Bush – trombone
Dion Tucker – trombone
Joe Barati – bass trombone
Arthur Latin II – drums, percussion
The Honolulu Heartbreakers – vocals

Tour

A Holiday Celebration Tour 2008, is a concert tour with his big band to support the album. The tour was confirmed by the official Harry Connick Jr. website in September 2008.

One of their stops included the annual lighting of the Rockefeller Center Christmas Tree.

Tour dates

References

External links
Harry Connick Jr.'s official website
Harry Connick Jr.'s official Sony BMG Music page

Harry Connick Jr. albums
2008 Christmas albums
Christmas albums by American artists
Jazz Christmas albums
Columbia Records Christmas albums